"Don't Look Back" is the fourth single of British singer-songwriter Lucie Silvas from her 2004 debut album, Breathe In.

Track listings

Charts

References

Lucie Silvas songs
2004 songs
2005 singles
Mercury Records singles
Songs written by Judie Tzuke
Songs written by Lucie Silvas
Songs written by Mike Peden